The Conservators of the River Cam are the navigation authority for the River Cam in Cambridgeshire and were founded in 1702.

History
Cambridge had been a major inland port as a result of its position on the navigable River Cam for centuries, but this position changed with the draining of the Fens. The most notable change was caused by the construction of Denver sluice on the River Great Ouse, under the terms of the Drainage Act of 1649, which resulted in tidal waters being cut off from the River Cam. Navigation became difficult, and in 1697, both the University of Cambridge and the town corporation complained to parliament that the supply of goods to the town from Kings Lynn was greatly impaired.

Against this background, the Corporation sought to obtain an Act of Parliament in 1699, which would allow them to reinstate navigation to Cambridge. The Act was obtained on 27 February 1702 and established the Conservators as a legal body with powers to collect tolls in order to maintain the river. Tolls ranged from four shillings (20p) a ton for wine to one penny (0.4p) for each passenger using the river, and the Conservators, of whom there were a maximum of eleven, were empowered to mortgage the tolls in order to raise capital with which to improve the condition of the river. This they did, and built sluices at Jesus Green, Chesterton, Baits Bite and Clayhithe. Most of the tolls were collected at Clayhithe.

Denver sluice collapsed prior to 1820, and although the Corporation of Cambridge opposed its rebuilding, it was rebuilt by 1850. Tolls on the river gradually increased, from £432 in 1752, to over £1,000 in 1803. 1835 was the best year, when tolls reached £1,995, after which they declined again, although they did not drop below £1,000 until 1847. The Conservators appear to have managed the river prudently, deriving a little extra revenue in rents from public houses which were constructed at each of the sluices.

The Cam Navigation Act of 1813 gave the Conservators powers to raise tolls and to charge penalties, while the South Level Act of 1827 extended their control over the section of river from Popes Corner to Bottisham. This Act also increased the number of Conservators by two, as the Mayor of Cambridge and vice-chancellor of the University were appointed as official members of the body. They built locks at Baits Bite and Bottisham, and removed the sluice at Chesterton. They donated £400 towards the cost of rebuilding the Great Bridge in 1823, and a further £300 towards the cost of the small bridge in 1841. The following year they spent £880 on constructing a house at Clayhithe, which included a large room suitable for meetings and banquets.

The coming of the railways in 1845 brought to an end the success of the navigation. The Commissioners received £1,393 from tolls in 1846 but only £367 in 1850. Two further acts of parliament were obtained in 1851 and 1894, largely to alter the tolls, but receipts continued to fall, to £99 in 1898 and £79 in 1905. By this time, the lower river was managed by the South Level Commissioners, and the River Cam Commissioners again managed the river above Bottisham lock.

Responsibility for the lower river passed to the Environment Agency in 1995, but the Conservators remain as the navigation authority for the river above Bottisham lock. The house at Clayhithe still stands, and is now the residence of the foreman of the Conservators.

Notable Conservators
Gregory Wale

References

External links
Official website

Organisations based in Cambridgeshire
River navigations in the United Kingdom
River Cam